Leslie Brown (27 November 1936 – 28 January 2021) was an English association football midfielder. He was part of the Great Britain team at the 1960 Summer Olympics, but he did not play in any matches. He later became an entrepreneur. 

Brown died on 28 January 2021, at the age of 84.

References

1936 births
2021 deaths
Association football midfielders
Dulwich Hamlet F.C. players
English footballers
Footballers at the 1960 Summer Olympics
Olympic footballers of Great Britain
Wimbledon F.C. players
Place of birth missing
Place of death missing
Date of death missing